Kevin William Considine is an Australian former rugby league footballer who played in the 1950s and 1960s.

Playing career
Considine started his career as a Canterbury junior from the Lakemba J.R.L.F.C. and was graded with Newtown in 1951. He went on to play nine seasons of first grade between 1952-1960 at Newtown, and was a prolific point scorer. 

He played 138 games for Newtown and scored 87 tries, kicked 93 goals for a total of 447 points. Considine scored 22 tries in 1954 and built up a great wing partnership with Ray Preston during this era. Kevin Considine played in the 1954 Grand Final and the 1955 Grand Final. He finished his first grade career at Parramatta in 1961, although he returned to Newtown in 1968 as a committeeman, and was later secretary-manager of Newtown League Club. He remained in the club/hotel industry for much of his working life.

References

1930 births
Living people
Australian rugby league players
Newtown Jets players
Parramatta Eels players
Rugby league players from Sydney
Sportsmen from New South Wales
Rugby league wingers